Desroches Airport  is an airport serving Desroches Island (Île Desroches) in the Seychelles.

Desroches Island, a former coconut and timber plantation, is the main island of the Amirante Islands, part of the Outer Islands.

Airlines and Destinations

See also

Transport in Seychelles
List of airports in Seychelles

References

External links
OpenStreetMap - Desroches
OurAirports - Desroches
FallingRain - Desroches Airport

Airports in Seychelles